The Silver Bullet is a 1935 American Western film directed by Bernard B. Ray and starring Tom Tyler, Jayne Regan and Lafe McKee.

Main cast
 Tom Tyler as Tom Henderson  
 Jayne Regan as Nora Kane / Mary Kane  
 Lafe McKee as Dad Kane  
 Charles King as Luke Hargrave  
 George Chesebro as Slim Walker  
 Slim Whitaker as Scurvy  
 Lew Meehan as Pete  
 Franklyn Farnum as Marshal Joe Mullane  
 Hal Taliaferro as Deputy Dick

References

Bibliography
 Pitts, Michael R. Poverty Row Studios, 1929–1940: An Illustrated History of 55 Independent Film Companies, with a Filmography for Each. McFarland & Company, 2005.

External links
 

1935 films
1935 Western (genre) films
American Western (genre) films
Films directed by Bernard B. Ray
Reliable Pictures films
American black-and-white films
1930s English-language films
1930s American films